The Spirit of Christmas is the title given to two adult stop motion animated short films created by Trey Parker and Matt Stone. The two films were released at different periods—the first in 1992, and the second in 1995—and form the basis for the animated series South Park, the latter short featuring more established depictions of the series' setting and characters. To differentiate between them, the respective films have been retroactively referred to as Jesus vs. Frosty and Jesus vs. Santa.

1992 film (Jesus vs. Frosty)

Plot
A group of four boys are building their own Frosty the Snowman, and in the spirit of the song, use a magic top hat to bring him to life, despite the warnings of one of the boys. The snowman quickly develops a psychopathic disposition, proceeding to kill one of the boys, Kenny, to the other boys' shock.

The boys seek aid from what appears to be Santa Claus. He reveals himself to be Frosty and kills another of the boys. The two remaining boys run away toward a Nativity scene. Jesus emerges from the scene and defeats Frosty by slicing off his hat with his halo. After Jesus returns to the scene, the two boys realize the purported "true" meaning of Christmas: presents. As a goat nibbles on Kenny's corpse, the boys return to their homes to find presents hidden by their parents.

Production
In 1992, Parker and Stone created The Spirit of Christmas while attending the University of Colorado under the Avenging Conscience moniker. Prior to this, Parker and Stone ran camera tests, during which they made impressions of children's voices, which were later used in South Park. Near the end of the semester, Parker conceived The Spirit of Christmas after watching a series of films with Stone. The film, created with construction paper and filmed with an old 8 mm film camera, premiered during the December 1992 student film screening. The film features four children very similar in appearance to three of the four main characters of South Park, including a character resembling Eric Cartman named Kenny, a hooded boy resembling Kenny McCormick, and two other boys similar in appearance and voice to Stan Marsh and Kyle Broflovski.

The film is referenced in the season six episode "Simpsons Already Did It". In the episode Tweek Tweak is reluctant to complete a snowman out of fear that it will come to life and kill him, to which Stan replies, "Dude, when has that ever happened except for that one time?"

1995 film (Jesus vs. Santa)

Plot 
The boys are singing "We Wish You a Merry Christmas" when Stan points out that Kyle is Jewish. Kyle then starts to sing the "Dreidel Song", but is mocked by Stan and Cartman. Their arguing is interrupted when Jesus appears, asking them to lead him to the mall, where they find Santa Claus.

Jesus is angry with Santa because he feels he diminishes the memory of Jesus' birthday with his presents. Santa, insistent that Christmas is a time for giving, rouses Jesus into fighting him, claiming that "there can be only one". Their fight causes large-scale destruction that kills various bystanders, including Kenny. Jesus pins Santa down, and each of them asks the boys to help them. The boys hesitate and wonder, "What would Brian Boitano do?" Boitano appears before the boys and delivers a speech about how Christmas should be about being good to one another. The boys tell the fighters of Boitano's message, and they apologize to each other in shame. They thank the boys for helping them and forgive each other. The boys realize that the true meaning of Christmas is presents, and Kyle remarks that Jewish children receive presents for eight days during Hanukkah. Intrigued, the other boys decide to become Jews as well, and the three leave the scene as rats gather near Kenny's corpse.

Production
In 1995, after seeing the 1992 film, Fox executive Brian Graden commissioned Parker and Stone to create a similar film as a video Christmas card that he could send to friends. The short film was completed by December 1995 and Graden initially distributed the video to eighty friends.

After The Spirt of Christmas became popular, Parker and Stone began to develop the characters and setting into an animated series titled South Park, and Fox was the first network they pitched the project to. After negotiations with Stone and Parker, Fox declined the series due to one of its characters being a sentient piece of feces, which later became Mr. Hankey. After bootleg distribution of the short made it a viral phenomenon, it caught the attention of Comedy Central, which hired the pair to develop the series. South Park premiered on Comedy Central in August 1997 to immediate success.

This version of The Spirit of Christmas features a more established setting, which is explicitly named South Park; and Stan, Kyle, Cartman and Kenny are referred to by name for the first time. There is also a character similar in appearance to Wendy Testaburger sitting on Santa's lap. The film also establishes recurring elements that later appear in the series, such as Cartman's antisemitism and rats consuming Kenny's corpse. The film reportedly had a budget of $750, with Parker and Stone keeping the remainder of their $1,000 commission.

The film's development is reflected in the fourth season episode "A Very Crappy Christmas". The episode revolves around the boys creating a Christmas card to raise the townspeoples' spirits during a bleak Christmas season, using a similar method of animation to the short films. Some lines of dialogue from Jesus vs. Santa are reused verbatim, and clips from the film are used later in the episode.

Release and reception
Jesus vs. Santa received a Los Angeles Film Critics Association Award for best animation in 1996.

The film can be found on the South Park The Hits: Volume 1 DVD. Short clips of both films are used in the original version of the series' theme song.

It was also included in AVI format on the first 100,000 pressings of Tiger Woods '99 for PlayStation. It is accessible from the game disc by PC in a file named "ZZDUMMY.DAT." This unauthorized use caused the game to be recalled in January 1999 by Electronic Arts.

A clip of Jesus and Santa's fight briefly appears on a billboard during the opening sequence for South Park'''s first six seasons.

Avenging Conscience
Avenging Conscience was formed by Parker, Stone, and two other students at the University of Colorado. They named the company after the D.W. Griffith film of the same name, which both had seen and actively disliked. It was formed to produce The Spirit of Christmas (1992) and Cannibal! The Musical (1993). Since then, three more projects were produced by Avenging Conscience: The Spirit of Christmas (1995), Orgazmo, and The Book of Orgazmo''.

See also

 List of Christmas films
 Santa Claus in film

References

External links 
 South Park Studios: Creator Bios
 
 

1992 films
1995 films
Portrayals of Jesus in film
Santa Claus in film
Stop-motion animated short films
South Park (franchise) films
American Christmas films
Works by Trey Parker and Matt Stone
1990s American animated films
Film series introduced in 1992
American film series